Paweł Thomik (born 25 January 1985 in Zabrze) is a Polish-German footballer who currently plays and works as an assistant manager for the reserve team of fourth tier side SV Heimstetten.

Career

Club
In July 2011, he joined Górnik Zabrze on a three-year contract.

References

External links
 
 Paul Thomik at FuPa

1985 births
Living people
Polish footballers
German people of Polish descent
German footballers
SpVgg Unterhaching players
VfL Osnabrück players
FC Bayern Munich II players
1. FC Union Berlin players
Górnik Zabrze players
Würzburger Kickers players
Ekstraklasa players
2. Bundesliga players
3. Liga players
Germany youth international footballers
Sportspeople from Zabrze
Expatriate footballers in Poland
Association football midfielders
SV Heimstetten players